

See also 
 Lists of fossiliferous stratigraphic units in Europe

References 
 

 Lithuania
 
 
Fossiliferous stratigraphic units